Cerys is a Welsh feminine given name. It is a variant of Carys.

Cerys may refer to:
 Cerys Hale (born 1993), Welsh rugby union player
 Cerys Matthews (born 1969), Welsh singer and songwriter

Notes and references 

Welsh feminine given names